Brafees Creek is a stream in Chippewa County, Minnesota, in the United States.

Brafees Creek (or Brofee's Creek) was named for a pioneer settler.

See also
List of rivers of Minnesota

References

Rivers of Chippewa County, Minnesota
Rivers of Minnesota